Prince Agha Abdul Karim  Ahmedzai was the younger brother of the last Khan of Kalat, Mir Ahmedyar Khan.

See also
History of Balochistan

References

External links
 

Brahui people
Nawabs of Pakistan
People of the insurgency in Balochistan
Pakistani expatriates in Afghanistan